Margarita Sofocleous (born 16 December 1986) is a Cypriot footballer who plays as a defender. She has been a member of the Cyprus women's national team.

Club career
On 13 July 2009, Sofocleous joined Apollon Ladies FC.

International career
Sofocleous capped for Cyprus at senior level during the 2017 Aphrodite Cup, including a 1–2 loss to Latvia on 12 March 2017.

References

1986 births
Living people
Women's association football defenders
Cypriot women's footballers
Cyprus women's international footballers
Apollon Ladies F.C. players